François Paul Anthoine (28 February 1860 – 25 December 1944) was a French Army general during the First World War.

When the Great War began, Anthoine was General Castelnau's Chief of Staff (Second Army).

Anthoine played an important role in Robert Nivelle's ill-fated campaign in spring 1917.

Anthoine was eventually promoted to command French Fourth Army in March 1917 then French First Army in June 1917. At the Third Battle of Ypres in autumn 1917, Anthoine and the First Army participated in the attacks on the northern flank of the salient and guarded the BEF's northern flank from enemy attack across the Yser Canal. Herbert Plumer's Second Army was given a parallel task, attacking the southern flank of the salient and guarding the BEF's southern flank.

Anthoine then served as chief of staff to Petain, French commander in chief, but was dismissed as he was thought “too pessimistic” after the near catastrophe of the Third Battle of the Aisne in May 1918.

After this disgrace, François Anthoine died many years later in 1944.

References

Further reading
 Evans, M. M. (2004). Battles of World War I. Select Editions. .

External links
 Colour picture of Gen. Anthoine from 1917
 Biography of Gen. Anthoine in French

1860 births
1944 deaths
French generals
French military personnel of World War I
Grand Croix of the Légion d'honneur
Grand Officers of the Order of Saints Maurice and Lazarus
Grand Officers of the Order of the Crown (Belgium)
People of the Tonkin campaign
Recipients of the Croix de Guerre 1914–1918 (France)
Recipients of the Croix de guerre (Belgium)